Strymon is an American manufacturer of audio equipment, originally called Damage Control Engineering. They are best known for their line of high end guitar effects pedals which use a mixture of analog circuitry and digital signal processing. The company is based in Westlake Village, California, and manufactures products in the United States.

Products 
Under the Damage Control name, the company's product line included several guitar preamps, distortions, multi-effects, and delays which utilized tubes within the pedals themselves. 

The Strymon product line includes distortion, delay,
reverb,
chorus,
flanger, and compressor pedals for guitar.

References

External links 

 Official website

Electronics companies of the United States
Music equipment manufacturers
Guitar effects manufacturing companies
Companies based in Westlake Village, California